An honor society is a private society basing inclusion upon excellence.

Honor society may also refer to:

 Honor Society (band), an American pop-rock band
 Honor Society (film), a 2022 American coming-of-age comedy film

See also 
 Honour (disambiguation)